Mydukur is a Municipality in YSR Kadapa district of the Indian state of Andhra Pradesh. It is located in Mydukur mandal of Badvel revenue division. Mydukur is located on Main Junction of NH-40 and NH-67. It is a junction point for Kurnool, Kadapa, Proddatur, Markapur, and Nellore Highways.

Education
The primary and secondary school education is imparted by government, aided and private schools, under the School Education Department of the state.

See also
Mydukur (assembly constituency)

References

Cities and towns in Kadapa district